Lesbos Prefecture was one of the prefectures of Greece. It comprised three main islands: Lesbos itself, Lemnos, and the smaller island of Agios Efstratios. Its capital was the town of Mytilene, on Lesbos.  In 2011 the prefecture was abolished and the territory was divided between the regional units of Lesbos and Lemnos.

Places

 Mytilene, the capital city of the island and the prefecture itself.
 Kalloni, the central town of the island of Lesbos.
 Agia Paraskevi, on the island of Lesbos.
 Eressos, on the island of Lesbos.
 Myrina, capital town of the island of Limnos.
 Agios Efstratios, on the homonymous isle.

Provinces
 Province of Lemnos – Myrina
 Province of Mithymna – Mithymna
 Province of Mytilene – Mytilene
 Province of Plomari – Plomari
Note: Provinces no longer hold any legal status in Greece.

Municipalities and communities

See also
 Aeolic Greek
 List of settlements in Lesbos
 List of settlements in the Lemnos regional unit

External links

 
 Prefecture of Lesvos (Hellenic Ministry of Culture)

Prefectures of Greece
Geography of the North Aegean
History of Lesbos
History of Lemnos
1915 establishments in Greece
States and territories established in 1915
2010 disestablishments in Greece
States and territories disestablished in 2010